Jeanne Dietsch (born April 16, 1952) is an American politician and businesswoman who served as a Democratic member of the New Hampshire Senate, representing the 9th district from 2018 to 2020.

Early life and education 
Dietsch was born in Kenton and grew up in Marion, Ohio, with her parents and three brothers. Dietsch attended Western Michigan University, where she graduated with a B.S. in 1974.

Career 
Dietsch co-founded ActivMedia Robotics in 1995, and was its CEO until the company was sold in 2010 to Adept Technology. The company is now owned by Omron Automation. Dietsch, along with Patrick Joseph McGovern, also served as the president of TALMIS, a market research firm which studied the use of computers in homes and schools.

Dietsch published an e-commerce market report, "Who's Succeeding on the Internet and How", months after the Internet opened to the public for commerce.

Dietsch served on the board of the IEEE Robotics and Automation Society Industrial Activities committee

Government service 
Dietsch was a member of a local planning board in Peterborough, NH. Dietsch unsuccessfully ran for State Senate in New Hampshire in 2016, losing in the primary to Lee Nyquist.

In 2018, Dietsch won 54% of votes in the Democratic primary. She later won the general election against Republican Dan Hynes, 14,037 to 12,776. Dietsch served as Vice Chair of the Senate Education and Workforce Development Committee and Chair of the Commission on the Environmental and Health Impacts of Perfluorinated Chemicals. She is also a member of the Ways and Means Committee, the Joint Legislative Committee on Administrative Rules and the Business Finance Authority.

Political positions 
Dietsch has been a proponent of an income tax. In 2019, Dietsch was the sponsor for a last minute amendment, to an unrelated bill dealing with using cell phones while driving, which would have added a 6.2% payroll tax.

In June 2020, Dietsch was quoted on comments made at a House Education Committee Meeting while debating a bill on school choice, where she stated “this idea of parental choice, that’s great if the parent is well-educated. There are some families that’s perfect for. But to make it available to everyone? No. I think you’re asking for a huge amount of trouble.”

Dietsch's bill to establish Telecommunications Districts, in order to ease rural broadband expansion, became law in 2020.

Personal life 
She moved to Ann Arbor, Michigan, and married Bill Kennedy in 1974 in the same year. The couple have two children, Eva and Ethan.

References

External links
Official NH Senate website
Vote Smart
Ballotpedia

1952 births
Living people
Democratic Party New Hampshire state senators
People from Peterborough, New Hampshire
American computer businesspeople
Computer science writers
Women technology writers
Women state legislators in New Hampshire
Harvard Kennedy School alumni
21st-century American women politicians
21st-century American politicians